The Tatar Trail of Podlaskie Voivodeship in Eastern Poland consists of two marked trails along sites related to the Lipka Tatars. The longer Szlak Tatarski Duży, marked in green, has 57 kilometers. The blue-marked Szlak Tatarski Mały is shorter at 19 kilometers of length
. The attractions are mainly of historical interest. Rural tourism facilities give opportunity to meet Tatar families and learn about their culture. As it runs through the Knyszyń Forest, the trail offers insight into nature as well.

Trail's route 

Szlak Tatarski Duży runs through Sokółka, Bohoniki, Stara Kamionka, Wierzchlesie, Talkowszczyzna, Nowa Świdziałówka and Kruszyniany.

The shorter Szlak Tatarski Mały encompasses Kruszyniany, Józefowo, Królowe Stojło and Waliły-Stacja. It connects sites related to Tatar settlement in Podlachia with the ones related to the January Uprising.

Main attractions 

 Sokółka
 Regional Museum, which has sections related to Lipka Tatar history
 16th/17th century town square
 St. Anthony's Catholic Church, a neoclassical building erected in 1848
 St. Alexander Newski’s Orthodox Church from 1830
 Bohoniki
 Bohoniki Mosque, a wooden mosque built in 19th century
 Islamic cemetery. With three centuries of history and at 2ha, this is the oldest and the biggest still active Muslim graveyard
 Kruszyniany
 Kruszyniany Mosque, built from wood, the oldest Tatar mosque in Poland
 Muslim cemetery

Gallery

References 

Podlaskie Voivodeship
Lipka Tatars